Eikerbladet (The Eiker Gazette) is a local Norwegian newspaper published in Mjøndalen in Buskerud county. 

The newspaper appears on Tuesdays and Fridays, and it covers events in the municipalities of Øvre Eiker and Nedre Eiker. The paper's editor is Knut Bråthen.

Circulation
According to the Norwegian Media Businesses' Association, Eikerbladet has had the following annual circulation:
 2006: 2,485
 2007: 2,628
 2008: 2,676
 2009: 2,716
 2010: 2,789
 2011: 2,792
 2012: 2,901
 2013: 3,076
 2014: 3,179
 2015: 3,070
 2016: 3,020

References

External links
Eikerbladet home page

Newspapers published in Norway
Norwegian-language newspapers
Mass media in Buskerud
Buskerud
Publications established in 1992
1992 establishments in Norway